HD 283750, also known as V833 Tauri, is a K-type main-sequence star 57 light-years away from the Sun. The star is much younger than the Sun's at 1 billion years. HD 283750 is similar to the Sun in its concentration of heavy elements. 

The star has a co-moving white dwarf companion WD 0443+270  at a projected separation of 124″, both possibly ejected members of the Hyades cluster. The white dwarf companion has a rather exotic iron core and belongs to spectral class DA9 and has the mass of 0.62.

Although HD 283750 was classified as a multi-period variable, a paper in 2020 claims its variability is not exceeding the variability of the Sun, and no period can be identified.

HD 283750 is covered by a large amount of starspots, filling up to 28% of the stellar surface at the maxima of the magnetic cycle. In November 1993, the star emitted an extremely powerful flare with energy of 7.47×1034 ergs, which is on or even above the upper limit of possible energy releases in flare stars. The flares of HD 283750 are accompanied by particle beams strong enough to affect the polarization properties of the stellar photosphere.

Suspected substellar companion
In 1996 a suspected 50- brown dwarf HD 283750b on a 1.79-day orbit around HD 283750 was detected by the differential Doppler spectroscopy method. By 2007, the mass of the companion was refined to 0.19, making it a red dwarf star.

References

Taurus (constellation)
K-type main-sequence stars
Binary stars
J04364822+2707559
0171.2
BD+26 730
283750
021482
Flare stars
BY Draconis variables
Tauri, V833